The following events occurred in August 1955:

August 1, 1955 (Monday)
Norway's Ministry of Pay and Prices is established, headed by Gunnar Bråthen.

August 2, 1955 (Tuesday)
Died: Wallace Stevens, 75, American poet

August 3, 1955 (Wednesday)
The English-language première of Samuel Beckett's play Waiting for Godot, directed by Peter Hall, takes place at the Arts Theatre, London.

August 4, 1955 (Thursday)
The 1955 Mitropa Cup football competition is won by Vörös Lobogó, with ÚDA Praha as runners-up after the second leg of the final.
While her act is being filmed for NBC variety series The Jimmy Durante Show, Carmen Miranda complains of feeling ill and out of breath, but finishes her performance.

August 5, 1955 (Friday)
Died: Carmen Miranda, 46, Portuguese Brazilian singer and actress (pre-eclampsia)

August 6, 1955 (Saturday)
The French Southern and Antarctic Territories are created, as an overseas territory of France.

August 7, 1955 (Sunday)
The French département of Bône is created out of the eastern extremity of the former département of Constantine in Algeria.

August 8, 1955 (Monday)
Composer Luigi Nono marries Arnold Schoenberg's daughter Nuria in Venice.
At Edwards Air Force Base in California, an explosion occurs inside the rocket engine of the X-1A research aircraft while it is being carried under its B-29 mother ship prior to a planned flight by test pilot Joseph A. Walker. Walker climbs out of the X-1A back into the B-29, but pilot Stan Butchart, unable to risk landing the B-29 with the X-1A still attached to its underside, is forced to drop the rocket plane, which explodes in the desert.
Died: Grace Hartman, 48, American actress

August 9, 1955 (Tuesday)
The Canadian National Railway opens its part of Walkley Yard in Ottawa, Canada.
Born: Maud Olofsson, Swedish politician, in Arnäsvall

August 10, 1955 (Wednesday)
The Division of Stirling is created in a Western Australia electoral redistribution.

August 11, 1955 (Thursday)
As a formation of nine United States Air Force Fairchild C-119 Flying Boxcars flies over Edelweiler, near Stuttgart, West Germany, on a training mission carrying troops, one of them, a C-119G, experiences engine trouble, loses altitude momentarily, pulls upward abruptly, and collides with another C-119G. Both aircraft crash, killing all 19 people aboard one and all 47 aboard the other. The combined death toll of 66 makes it the worst aviation accident in German history at the time and the deadliest ever involving any variant of the C-119. It will tie with the March 22 crash of a United States Navy R6D-1 Liftmaster in Hawaii and the October 6 crash of United Airlines Flight 409 in Wyoming as the deadliest air accident of 1955.
Burhanuddin Harahap becomes Prime Minister of Indonesia.

August 12, 1955 (Friday)
 Hurricane Connie strikes North Carolina as a Category 2 on the Saffir-Simpson scale.
Died:
Thomas Mann, 80, German novelist, Nobel Prize laureate 
James B. Sumner, 67, American chemist, Nobel Prize laureate

August 13, 1955 (Saturday)
Died: Florence Easton, 72, English-born operatic soprano

August 14, 1955 (Sunday)
The US schooner Levin J. Marvel capsizes and sinks in Chesapeake Bay with the loss of twelve of the 24 people on board. It was lost during high waves in Hurricane Connie.

August 15, 1955 (Monday)
Rear Admiral Royce de Mel becomes the first native Commander of the Royal Ceylon Navy.  He would later be implicated in the 1962 Ceylonese coup d'état attempt.

August 16, 1955 (Tuesday)

August 17, 1955 (Wednesday)
Died: Fernand Léger, 74, French painter and sculptor

August 18, 1955 (Thursday)
The First Sudanese Civil War begins.
First meeting of the Organization of Central American States (Organización de Estados Centroamericanos, ODECA), in Antigua Guatemala.

August 19, 1955 (Friday)
Hurricane Diane hits the northeastern United States, killing over 200 people and causing over $1.0 billion in damage.

August 20, 1955 (Saturday)
Hundreds of people are killed in anti-French rioting in Morocco and Algeria, → Battle of Philippeville.
Flying a U.S. Air Force North American F-100C Super Sabre, Horace A. Haines sets a world speed record of 822.135 mph (1,323.889 km/h).

August 21, 1955 (Sunday)

August 22, 1955 (Monday)
Eleven schoolchildren are killed when their school bus is hit by a freight train in Spring City, Tennessee, United States after the driver disregards a crossing signal; a further 39 are injured.

August 23, 1955 (Tuesday)
The Westland Widgeon helicopter makes its maiden flight. 
Died: Rudolf Minger, 73, Swiss politician

August 24, 1955 (Wednesday)

August 25, 1955 (Thursday)
In China, the Sufan movement issues its "Directive on the thorough purge and cleansing of hidden counter-revolutionaries".
The last Soviet Army occupation forces leave Austria.

August 26, 1955 (Friday)
Satyajit Ray's film Pather Panchali is released in Calcutta, India, receiving a poor initial response but quickly attracting audiences to become a classic of Indian cinema.

August 27, 1955 (Saturday)
The first edition of the Guinness Book of Records is published, in London, compiled by Norris and Ross McWhirter.
Born: Sergey Khlebnikov, Soviet speed skater (d. 1999)
Died: Augusto Turati, 67, Italian fascist politician

August 28, 1955 (Sunday)
The Challenge Round of the 1955 Davis Cup tennis competition is won by Australia at the West Side Tennis Club, Forest Hills, New York, USA.
Died: Emmett Till, 14, African-American teenager, murdered in Mississippi for speaking to a white woman.

August 29, 1955 (Monday)
A British Royal Air Force English Electric Canberra sets a new world altitude record of 65,876 ft (20,079 m).
The 1955 CCCF Championship soccer competition ends in victory for Costa Rica.

August 30, 1955 (Tuesday)
Grodno Zoo, in Belarus, receives its first Asian elephant, from Vietnam.
Patrolmen William Hudec and Warren Stainbrook of the Cleveland Division of Police are killed when a train strikes the police ambulance they are driving. Hudec is the father of actress Majel Leigh Hudec, who will later be better known as Majel Barrett and play multiple roles in the Star Trek franchise.

August 31, 1955 (Wednesday)
The Hudson and Manhattan Railroad begins experiments with air conditioning on its subway cars, a technology that the New York City Subway system declared impractical before then. This experiment results in the first successful production application of air conditioning in a rapid transit car, 50 cars (20 owned by H&M, 30 by H&M parent PRR) built by St. Louis Car Company in 1958.
Lockheed Aircraft Corporation engineering test pilot Stanley Beltz is killed in a crash near Lancaster, California, USA, while piloting an F-94B Starfire modified to test the nose section of the BOMARC missile.

References

1955
1955-08
1955-08